Battlement Mesa Forest Reserve was established by the General Land Office in Colorado on December 24, 1892, with .  In 1905 all federal forests were transferred to the U.S. Forest Service. On July 1, 1908, part of the forest was combined with Holy Cross National Forest, part was renamed Battlement National Forest, and the original name was discontinued. The lands are presently included in White River National Forest and Grand Mesa National Forest.

References

External links
Forest History Society
Listing of the National Forests of the United States and Their Dates (from the Forest History Society website) Text from Davis, Richard C., ed. Encyclopedia of American Forest and Conservation History. New York: Macmillan Publishing Company for the Forest History Society, 1983. Vol. II, pp. 743-788.

Former National Forests of Colorado
Defunct forest reserves of the United States